The 1997–98 Division 1 was the 60th season of Division 1, the top French professional league for association football clubs, since its establishment in 1932. The season began on 2 August 1997, and concluded on 9 May 1998.

This season saw a change in the league format, with the number of teams reduced to 18 from 20, shortening the season from 38 to 34 rounds. As a result, four clubs which had been relegated at the end of the previous season were replaced by only two, Châteauroux and Toulouse, who entered as winners and runners up of the 1996–97 French Division 2. Defending champions of the 1996–97 season were Monaco.

Lens won the championship for the first time in their 92-year history, becoming the 26th club to become French football champions. Lens won their league title with 68 points, edging out second-placed Metz on goal difference, for whom this was their best result in history.

Teams

Stadia and personnel

League table 

Promoted from Ligue 2, who will play in Division 1 season 1998/1999
 AS Nancy : champion of Ligue 2
 FC Lorient : runners-up
 FC Sochaux-Montbéliard : third place

Results

Top goalscorers

References

External links 
 France 1997/98 at Rec.Sport.Soccer Statistics Foundation

Ligue 1 seasons
France
1